Whitethorn (formerly Thorn) is an unincorporated community in Humboldt County, California, United States. Whitethorn shares a ZIP Code, 95589, with Shelter Cove, California. It is located along California's Lost Coast.

Overview 

The Thorn post office opened in 1888, closed in 1923, reopened in 1951, and changed its name to Whitethorn in 1961. The Whitethorn post office is located near Thorn Junction on the road between Shelter Cove and Whitethorn. Some remote areas in northern Mendocino County are also served by this post office and thus have Whitethorn addresses.

Whitethorn Elementary School (grades K–7) is located in Whitethorn and is part of the Southern Humboldt Unified School District. Students from the Whitethorn area attend South Fork High School in Miranda.

They have Whitethorn addresses, but are located in Mendocino County and are part of the Leggett Valley Unified School District.

The ZIP Code is 95589. The community is inside area code 707.

Climate
Whitethorn has a warm-summer Mediterranean climate (Köppen climate classification: Csb) that is characterized by warm (but not hot) and dry summers, and mild to chilly, rainy and/or snowy winters. In Whitethorn's case, the climate is moderated by the proximity to the Pacific Ocean with small temperature variations on average throughout the year, which results in comfortable year-round temperatures.

Politics

See also

References

External links
 Whitethorn
 Redwoods Monastery
 South Humboldt Unified School District

Unincorporated communities in Humboldt County, California
Unincorporated communities in California